Todd Anthony "Moose" Linden (born June 30, 1980) is an American former professional baseball outfielder. He played in Major League Baseball (MLB) for the San Francisco Giants and Florida Marlins; and in Nippon Professional Baseball (NPB) for the Tohoku Rakuten Golden Eagles.

Early life
Before being drafted by the San Francisco Giants, he attended Central Kitsap High School in Silverdale, Washington and played collegiate baseball at the University of Washington.  After a tumultuous two years at Washington, Linden transferred  to  Louisiana State University, where he played center field.  At LSU, Linden distinguished himself as a switch hitter by setting a Southeastern Conference record for games in a season with home runs hit from both sides of the plate. After the 2000 season, he played collegiate summer baseball with the Chatham A's of the Cape Cod Baseball League and was named a league all-star. Nicknamed "Moose" by his Scranton/Wilkes-Barre Yankees teammates after a horrible offensive showing in Charlotte, where he was visibly frustrated by a Charlotte Knights fan in the front row who berated him with moose references.

Professional career

San Francisco Giants
His first major league home run came on September 22, off Los Angeles Dodgers pitcher Kazuhisa Ishii. On May 10, he was designated for assignment.

Florida Marlins
He was claimed off waivers by the Florida Marlins on May 18, 2007. The Marlins released him following the 2007 season.

Oakland Athletics
On November 21, 2007, he was signed by the Oakland Athletics to a minor league contract (Sacramento River Cats) with an invitation to spring training, but did not make the A's roster. On May 20, 2008, Linden was released by the Oakland A's.

Cleveland Indians
On May 27, 2008, Linden signed a minor league contract (Buffalo Bisons) with the Cleveland Indians and was assigned to their Triple-A affiliate, the Buffalo Bisons. He became a free agent at the end of the season.

New York Yankees
In January  Linden signed a minor league contract (Scranton/Wilkes-Barre Yankees) with an invitation to spring training with the New York Yankees.

Tohoku Rakuten Golden Eagles
On June 12, 2009, the Yankees sold Linden's contract to the Tohoku Rakuten Golden Eagles of the Japanese Pacific League.

San Francisco Giants
Linden attended minor league camp with the Giants in 2012.

Coaching
Linden is currently a coach in the San Francisco Giants minor league system. He also coaches for city baseball year round.

References

External links
, or Retrosheet
Pelota Binaria (Venezuelan League)

1980 births
Living people
Albuquerque Isotopes players
American expatriate baseball players in Japan
Baseball coaches from Washington (state)
Baseball players from Washington (state)
Buffalo Bisons (minor league) players
Chatham Anglers players
Edmonton Capitals players
Estrellas Orientales players
American expatriate baseball players in the Dominican Republic
Florida Marlins players
Fresno Grizzlies players
Grand Canyon Rafters players
LSU Tigers baseball players
Major League Baseball outfielders
Minor league baseball coaches
Navegantes del Magallanes players
American expatriate baseball players in Venezuela
Nippon Professional Baseball outfielders
People from Edmonds, Washington
Sacramento River Cats players
San Francisco Giants players
Scranton/Wilkes-Barre Yankees players
Shreveport Swamp Dragons players
Tohoku Rakuten Golden Eagles players
Venados de Mazatlán players
American expatriate baseball players in Mexico
Washington Huskies baseball players